N-acetylgalactosamine-6-sulfatase is an enzyme that, in humans, is encoded by the GALNS gene.

This gene encodes N-acetylgalactosamine-6-sulfatase, which is a lysosomal exohydrolase required for the degradation of the glycosaminoglycans keratan sulfate and chondroitin 6-sulfate. Sequence alterations including point, missense and nonsense mutations, as well as those that affect splicing, result in a deficiency of this enzyme. Deficiencies of this enzyme lead to Morquio A syndrome, a lysosomal storage disorder.

References

Further reading

External links
 
 PDBe-KB provides an overview of all the structure information available in the PDB for Human N-acetylgalactosamine-6-sulfatase